St. Patrick's Church, Belfast is a Roman Catholic church located in Donegall Street area of Belfast, Northern Ireland. The first church was opened on the site in 1815 while the current building dates from 1877.

First Church
Belfast's first Catholic church was St Mary's, Chapel Lane but with the growth of the Catholic population in the early nineteenth century Bishop William Crolly, then a priest in residence in the small Georgian town, decided to construct a new church in Donegall St. This church, dedicated to Ireland's patron saint Patrick, was opened in 1815, the construction made possible - in part - by the contribution of Belfast's educated Protestants and civic elite.

In the post-famine era Belfast's Catholic population swelled considerably and, while other churches and new parishes were developed, by the early 1870s it was clear St. Patrick's needed an entirely new and larger church.

Current Church
The new (current) church was designed by the architect Timothy Hevey who was Belfast's leading Catholic architect. It was built by Collen Brothers of Portadown and Dublin who constructed the new church around the old one which was then demolished.

The entire fabric of the new church, designed to seat 2000 people, was completed for blessing on 12 August 1877 by the Primate of All Ireland, Archbishop Daniel McGettigan of Armagh.

Bishop Patrick Dorrian, who early in his priestly ministry had served in the parish, and who authorised the construction of the present building is interred in the church.

The splendour and scale of the church meant it was the chosen venue for the episcopal consecrations of Bishops Henry Henry in 1895, of John Tohill in 1908 and later in 1929 of Bishop Daniel Mageean.

One notable feature is the indomitable 7 ft tall statue of St Patrick above the door which (like the altar) was carved by the English-born James Pearse, father of Padraig Pearse.

A two-ton bell, cast by Thomas Sheridan of Dublin, had already been placed into the 180 feet high (54 metre) spire.

It is a Grade B+ listed building. In the summer of 2017 it was reported that the church needed millions of pounds to complete restoration.

Sir John Lavery
The church also houses a triptych by a native of the parish who was baptised in the older, smaller church Sir John Lavery. He presented 'The Madonna Of The Lakes' using his wife Hazel Lavery and step-daughter as models.
In 1917, Lavery contacted the then Administrator Fr John O'Neill with the intention of donating a piece of art to the church.  The triptych depicting three images - Our Lady flanked by St Brigid and St Patrick - was unveiled in April 1919.

The art work was the centrepiece of an historic visit by Charles, Prince of Wales and his wife Camilla, Duchess of Cornwall to the church in May 2015 to mark St. Patrick's bicentenary. The couple viewed the church’s most treasured artwork after a short service of prayer.

Parish Clergy

In 2022 the parish is served by two resident clergy - Very Reverend Eugene O'Neill VF Parish Priest and Reverend Tony McAleese (curate).

Parish Mass Times

Sunday Masses begin on Saturday evening with a 6pm Vigil - Mass with music led by cantor and organ.  Masses on Sunday begin at 9.00am - Mass with organ, 11.00am - Solemn Mass with Choir and Incense, and 6.00pm - Mass by candlelight with Taizé-style music led by cantor and organist. Holyday of Obligation at 7.00pm Vigil; 1.00pm. Mondays to Fridays at 1.00pm.

Parish Confession Times

Daily, Monday to Friday immediately following 1pm Mass (usually 1.25pm).

St. Patrick's School
Adjacent to the church on Donegall St is the refurbished St. Patrick's School, constructed in 1828 by the Belfast builder Timothy Hevey, father of the architect of the same name who designed the church next door.  This was the first Catholic school to be built in Belfast on land was donated by the Marquess of Donegall.

For much of its history the school was operated by the Christian Brothers and was a functioning primary school until 1982. After it closed it served briefly as a parish community centre and at one stage the parish clergy wanted to demolish the school for a large car park.

References

Saint Patrick
Saint Patrick
Roman Catholic churches completed in 1877
19th-century Roman Catholic church buildings in the United Kingdom
Gothic Revival church buildings in Northern Ireland
Grade B+ listed buildings
1815 establishments in Ireland
19th-century churches in Northern Ireland